Budan (also Romanized as Būdān; also known as Budun) is a village in Karvan-e Sofla Rural District, Karvan District, Tiran and Karvan County, Isfahan Province, Iran. At the 2006 census, its population was 1,351, in 384 families.

References 

Populated places in Tiran and Karvan County